The Shire of Chillagoe was a local government area in Far North Queensland, Australia.

History
On 16 December 1908, a small part of Shire of Woothakata was transferred to the Shire of Walsh, which was then split with one part being proclaimed the new Shire of Chillagoe, based at Chillagoe.

On 25 June 1932, the Shires of Chillagoe and Walsh were merged back into the Shire of Woothakata, which was renamed the Shire of Mareeba on 20 December 1947.

Chairmen
 1927: William Cooper Bourke

References

External links
 

Former local government areas of Queensland
1932 disestablishments in Australia
1908 establishments in Australia